Mario Amaya (October 6, 1933 – June 29, 1986) was an American art critic, museum director and magazine editor, and (1972–1976) director of the New York Cultural Center and (1976–1979) the Chrysler Museum of Art in Norfolk, Virginia. He was also (1969–1972) the chief curator of the Art Gallery of Ontario and the founding editor of London's Art and Artists magazine. He studied Art Nouveau for 35 years, for some of this time under the teaching of the artist Mark Rothko.

Background
Mario Anthony Amaya was born in Brooklyn in 1933. After graduating from Brooklyn College in 1958, he travelled to England and was from 1962 to 1968 the assistant editor of the Royal Opera House magazine About the House. While still in England he was (from 1965–1968) the (founding) editor of Art and Artists magazine.

Shooting
On June 3, 1968, Amaya was in Andy Warhol's office when radical feminist Valerie Solanas opened fire and shot both him and Warhol. Amaya, 34 at the time, was discharged from hospital after receiving treatment of bullet grazes on his back.

Curatorial work
While in his curatorial positions he mounted major exhibitions of Art Nouveau. Examples include "Realism Now" (1972), "Blacks: USA" (1973), "Women Choose Women" (1973), and "Bouguereau" (organized with Robert Isaacson, 1975); he also arranged a retrospective of photographer Man Ray (1975). When he became the director of the New York Cultural Center in 1972, he helped strengthen the Center's position as one of the liveliest of New York's museums at the time. Amaya used his position at the Cultural Center to house over 150 shows in three years. Amaya also contributed to many galleries, and lectured and acted as a visiting professor at the State University of New York at Buffalo.

Writings

Amaya wrote books on art. Pop As Art: A Survey of the New Super Realism (1965), Art Nouveau (1966), and Tiffany Glass.

In the early 1970s, when living in London, Mario Amaya was engaged in research for a proposed biography of Lee Miller (with which she co-operated), but the project came to nothing.

Death
Amaya died from complications of AIDS on June 29, 1986, in hospital in Kensington and Chelsea, London, at the age of 52.

References
Notes

Sources
Amaya, Mario. Art Nouveau. Studio Vista, Ltd., London, 1966;
Bourdon, D. "New York Museum Crisis: Two Bite Dust." Art in America, vol.63, No.5, 1975;
Russell, John. "Mario Amaya, 52, Art Critic, Editor and Museum Director," The New York Times June 30, 1986;
Russell, John. "Obituary," Art in America, vol.74, 1986;
The Globe and Mail No. 36968, June 4, 1968.

1933 births
1986 deaths
AIDS-related deaths in England
American art critics
American expatriates in England
American shooting survivors
Directors of museums in the United States
Brooklyn College alumni
Writers from Brooklyn
20th-century American non-fiction writers
Journalists from New York City
University at Buffalo faculty